GOL TV is an American TV sports channel dedicated to soccer owned by GOLTV Inc., based in North Bay Village, Florida. The network broadcasts Portugal Primeira Liga, Paraguayan Primera División, Uruguayan Primera División, and Ecuadorian Serie A matches.

The network was among the first which started a trend of bilingual broadcasting among networks which serve both English language and Spanish language customers, a strategy since emulated by competitor beIN Sports with their English and Spanish networks and BabyFirst TV. GOL TV maintains one main feed with both English and Spanish language audio and bilingual promotional advertising (though paid programming can vary between English and Spanish and is not cross-translated). Some providers offer the two feeds as separate channels, while others present it as one channel with language selection handled by the viewer at the set-top box through the provider's secondary audio program (SAP) feature.

Ownership
GOL TV is a corporation of Florida, USA. , Enzo Francescoli was its CEO and managing director.

Carriage
As of 2017, GOL TV is available on Spectrum, and is available on Spanish language packages on DirecTV and AT&T U-verse. As of October 1, 2018, GOL TV is no longer included in Verizon Fios' channel line-up. Cox removed it from the lineup on April 1, 2019.

Talent

In Spanish:

Omar Fuentes: Commentary and host
Diego Tabares: Commentary and host
José Cerna: Play-by-play and host
Alejandro Figueredo: Play-by-play
Jesús E. Acosta: Play-by-play

In English:

José Cerna: Play-by-play and host
Felipe Mekhitarian: Commentary and host
Lindsey Dean: Play-by-play

Programs

UEFA
Primeira Liga (Portugal)
KNVB Cup

CONMEBOL
Ecuadorian Serie A
Paraguayan Primera División 
Uruguayan Primera División
Peruvian Primera División

Other programs

 Tu Fútbol - A weekly series that provides a recap and highlights of league matches from Uruguay. Tu Fútbol: Uruguay airs on Monday at 7:30 p.m. ET.
 Portugol - A weekly series showcasing a full recap and highlights of the Portuguese Primeira Liga. The program airs every Tuesday night starting at 7:30 p.m. ET.
 Foot Brazil - A weekly series that provides a recap and highlights of all the games from the São Paulo State Championship and the Brasileirão Serie A, as well as interviews with the biggest stars of Brazilian soccer. It airs on Wednesdays at 7 p.m. and 10 p.m. ET.
 The Football Review 
 Clubland

Former programs
 Campeonato Brasileiro, Campeonato Paulista
 Spanish La Liga (2004-2012), Copa del Rey
 Dutch Eredivisie
 UEFA Europa League
 CONCACAF qualifiers for the Gold Cup and FIFA World Cup
 Lamar Hunt U.S. Open Cup Final
 German Bundesliga
Coppa Italia
Supercoppa Italiana

GOL TV HD
GOL TV HD is a  1080i high definition simulcast of GOL TV that launched on August 1, 2010. Time Warner Cable in New York City added it on August 27, 2010.

See also
 GolTV Canada
 GOL TV (Latin American)

References

External links
 Gol TV Celebrates First Anniversary
 Official Site
 Gol TV Canada
 Gol TV Latinoamérica

Television channels and stations established in 2003
Soccer in Florida
Soccer on United States television
Spanish-language television stations
English-language television stations
Sports television networks in the United States